Camponotus thraso is a species of carpenter ant (genus Camponotus). The type species is found from Sri Lanka.

Subspecies
Camponotus thraso agricola Forel, 1910 - South Africa
Camponotus thraso assabensis Emery, 1925 - Ethiopia
Camponotus thraso diogenes Forel, 1909 - Sri Lanka
Camponotus thraso montinanus Santschi, 1926 - Zimbabwe
Camponotus thraso nefasitensis Menozzi, 1931 - Ethiopia
Camponotus thraso negus Forel, 1907 - Kenya, Zimbabwe, Ethiopia
Camponotus thraso thraso Forel, 1903 - Sri Lanka

References

External links

 at antwiki.org
Itis.gov
Animaldiversity.org

thraso
Hymenoptera of Asia
Insects described in 1893